The Racah seniority number (seniority quantum number)  was introduced by Giulio Racah for the classification of electrons in an atomic configuration. The "seniority number", in a loosing statement,  is quantum number additional to the total angular momentum  and total spin , which gives the degree of unpaired particles.

A spin-independent interaction  is assumed with the property

,

The eigenvalue is the "seniority number" .

References

Quantum mechanics